Aghada power station is a gas fired power station located near the entrance of Cork Harbour in Aghada, County Cork. It was built at this location in order to use gas that had been discovered at the nearby Kinsale Head gas field, from which gas was extracted from 1978 until its depletion in 2020.

The station has been operational since 1980, and in 2010 underwent a major upgrade which saw the output capacity almost double thanks to a new combined cycle gas turbine (CCGT). According to its owner, the ESB Group, these upgrades saw it become one of the "largest and most efficient" power stations in Ireland.

History
The plant consists of a single  conventional steam turbine and three  open-cycle gas turbines. The plant is fuelled with natural gas, which is supplied from the Bórd Gais network and diesel oil is used as an alternative fuel when natural gas supply is low.

2010 upgrade 
In May 2010, the Minister for Foreign Affairs, Micheál Martin, officially opened a new combined cycle gas turbine at the plant. The new CCGT was a major upgrade to the power station and provided a new base-load generating capacity to meet rising power demand in Ireland. The CCGT generates enough power to meet the electricity needs of around 450,000 homes.

The CCGT is a GT26 provided by Alstom. The upgrade was part of the ESB's portfolio restructuring programme, which included the closure and divestment of older and less efficient power stations.

Following the upgrade, Aghada consists of the following three types of technology:

Proposals 
In September 2022 the ESB announced that they were to submit a planning application with Cork County Council before the end of 2022 for the construction of a new open cycle gas turbine. The OCGT is to be within the existing grounds of Aghada power station and will be expected to generate .

References

Natural gas-fired power stations in the Republic of Ireland